Shaun Knight (born 19 February 1990) is an English rugby union player, currently playing for Hartpury University. He plays as a prop.

Knight played for Matson, Gloucester and as a dual-registered player for Moseley Rugby Football Club and Cinderford RFC. 

He was a member of England's 2009 and 2010 Junior World Cup squads and he spent July to October 2010 with Counties Manukau in New Zealand as part of their wider ITM Cup squad.

In July 2015 Knight joined the Welsh regional team Newport Gwent Dragons.

In September 2016 he joined Bath for the remainder of the 2016–17 season, which became a permanent deal until the end of the 2017–18 season.

On 28 May 2018, he left Bath to travel to France to join Rouen in the third division Federale 1, linking up with their head coach Richard Hill.

On 27 April 2020, Knight returned to Gloucester, England to sign for Hartpury University in the RFU Championship from the 2020–21 season.

References

External links
Newport Gwent Dragons profile
Gloucester Rugby profile

1990 births
Living people
Gloucester Rugby players
Moseley Rugby Football Club players
Dragons RFC players
Bath Rugby players
English rugby union players
Rugby union players from Gloucester
Hartpury University R.F.C. players